Flavastacin is an enzyme. This enzyme catalyses the following chemical reaction

 Hydrolyses polypeptides on the amino-side of Asp in -Xaa-Asp-. Acts very slowly on -Xaa-Glu

This zinc metalloendopeptidase belong to the peptidase family M12. It has recently been described as cleaving specifically after N-glycosylated asparagine, making it a potentially useful as a tool to analytically characterize glycoproteins.

References

External links 
 

EC 3.4.24